Melicerona is a genus of sea snails, marine gastropod mollusks in the family Cypraeidae, the cowries.

Species
Species within the genus Melicerona include:
Melicerona felina (Gmelin, 1791)
Melicerona listeri (Bouchet & Rocroi, 2005)

References

Cypraeidae